Peter Wiesinger (born 15 May 1938) is an Austrian philologist who specializes in Germanic studies.

Biography
Peter Wiesinger was born in Vienna, Austria on 15 May 1938. He received his PhD at the University of Vienna, was subsequently a researcher on German at the University of Marburg. Wiesinger habilitated at Marburg in 1969 was appointed a professor there in 1971.

From 1972 to 2006, Wiesinger was Professor of German Language and Old German Literature at the University of Vienna. He was President of the International Association for Germanic Studies from 1995 to 2000, and has served as its Honorary President since 2001. He is a member of the Austrian Academy of Sciences and the Polish Academy of Learning.

See also

 Heinrich Beck
 Hermann Reichert
 Helmut Birkhan
 Rudolf Simek
 Wilhelm Heizmann
 Otto Gschwantler

Sources
 

1961 births
Austrian non-fiction writers
Austrian philologists
Germanic studies scholars
Linguists of Germanic languages
Members of the Austrian Academy of Sciences
Members of the Polish Academy of Learning
Living people
University of Marburg alumni
Academic staff of the University of Marburg
University of Vienna alumni
Academic staff of the University of Vienna